Kevin Sorley (born July 6, 1993) is a Canadian ice sledge hockey player.

Sorley was a member of Canada's gold medal winning team at the 2017 World Para Ice Hockey Championships in Gangneung, South Korea.

He was also a member of Canada's silver medal winning team at the 2019 World Para Ice Hockey Championships in Ostrava, Czech Republic.

References

External links 
 

1993 births
Living people
Canadian sledge hockey players